The 1995 Leekes British Open Squash Championships was held at the Cardiff International Arena in Cardiff from 21–26 March 1995. The event was won by Michelle Martin for the third consecutive year defeating Liz Irving in a repeat of the 1994 final.

Seeds

Draw and results

Qualifying round

First round

Second round

Quarter-finals

Semi-finals

Final

References

Women's British Open Squash Championships
Squash in Wales
Women's British Open Squash Championship
1990s in Cardiff
Sports competitions in Cardiff
Women's British Open Squash Championship
1995 in women's squash
Squ